Sheho is a village in the Canadian province of Saskatchewan within the Rural Municipality of Insinger No. 275 and Census Division No. 9. Sheho is located on Saskatchewan Highway 16 (the Yellowhead highway), in southeast Saskatchewan between Foam Lake to the west and the City of Yorkton to the east. Sheho Lake post office first opened in 1891 at the legal land description of Sec.28, Twp.30, R.9, W2 before moving slightly and changing name to Sheho.

History 
Sheho incorporated as a village on June 30, 1905.

Demographics 

See also

 List of communities in Saskatchewan
 List of rural municipalities in Saskatchewan

Notes and references

Villages in Saskatchewan
Division No. 9, Saskatchewan